Alphabeta is an Israeli musical group. Alphabeta or Alpha Beta may also refer to:

The Greek alphabet, from Alpha (Αα) and Beta (Ββ), the first two letters
Alpha Beta, a former chain of Californian supermarkets
Alpha and beta anomers (chemistry)
Alpha–beta pruning, a type of search algorithm
Alpha-beta transformation, a mathematical transformation in electrical engineering
Alpha-beta unsaturated carbonyl compounds, a class of organic compounds
Alpha beta filter, a predictive filter
Alpha (finance) and Beta (finance), two measures characterizing the return of an investment portfolio
The Alpha Betas, a fraternity in the Revenge of the Nerds film series
Alpha Betas, an animated webseries created by Chris Bruno and David Howard Lee starring Evan Fong
An α/β barrel, a protein fold structure

See also
Alphabet (disambiguation)